RailsWest Railroad Museum is a railroad museum operated by the Historical Society of Pottawattamie County at 16th Avenue and South Main Street and illustrates the history of railroads in Council Bluffs, Iowa.

History
The museum is housed inside a Chicago, Rock Island and Pacific Railroad passenger depot that was also used by the Chicago, Milwaukee, St. Paul and Pacific.  The depot is listed on the National Register of Historic Places as Chicago, Rock Island and Pacific Railroad Passenger Depot and also has been known as just Rock Island Depot.
The depot opened in 1899 and would become a daily stop for the Rocky Mountain Rocket, Midwest Hiawatha, the Arrow, and Corn Belt Rocket before the end of passenger service in 1971.  Similar Rock Island passenger depots were also constructed in Iowa City, Iowa and Ottawa, Illinois.

Museum
RailsWest includes historical exhibits on the eight railroads that served the community along with displays on the Railway Mail Service and an extensive HO scale model railroad.  Adjacent to the historic depot are Union Pacific locomotive 814 and Chicago, Burlington and Quincy locomotive 915, Chicago, Rock Island and Pacific Railroad and Chicago, Burlington and Quincy cabooses, a 1953 switch engine built by the Plymouth Locomotive Works, the Chicago, Burlington and Quincy Omaha lounge car, a Union Pacific boxcar, and Union Pacific Railway Post Office car 5908.  RailsWest is adjacent to tracks of the Union Pacific, BNSF, and Iowa Interstate Railroad with a fenced-in area for railfanning.

References

External links 
 The RailsWest website
 The RailsWest Facebook page

Railroad museums in Iowa
Museums in Council Bluffs, Iowa
Railway stations in the United States opened in 1899
Council Bluffs
Railway stations on the National Register of Historic Places in Iowa
National Register of Historic Places in Pottawattamie County, Iowa
Former railway stations in Iowa
Transportation buildings and structures in Pottawattamie County, Iowa
Railway stations closed in 1971